Austrocochlea constellata is a species of sea snail, a marine gastropod mollusk in the family Trochidae, the top snails.

This is a species inquerenda.

Description
The height of the shell attains 9 mm, its diameter 10 mm. The oblique, imperforate shell has an orbiculate-conic shape and is slightly elevated. The base of the shell is very wide. The shell is longitudinally very obliquely subtly striate, and marked with a few spiral subimpressed lines which are sometimes obsolete, leaving the surface smooth. The color is plumbeous ashen, often with a pink tinge, speckled closely with white dots, and encircled with two dark bands which are articulated with larger spots of white. The sutures are impressed. The five whorls are subconvex, the last forming the greater portion of the shell. They are compressed, obtusely angulated, depressed below the suture. The surface of the base is almost entirely occupied by the parieto-columellar area. The very oblique aperture is pearly and iridescent inside. The thin outer lip acute, and continued on the base in an angle which bounds the columellar area. The thin, white columella is subhorizontal, very wide, subconcave, and bounded by a narrow brown streak outside.

There is considerable variation in the color pattern. Unlike most of the species in this genus, the base is not lined with a white thickened continuation of the columella.

Distribution
This marine species occurs off New Caledonia.

References

External links
 To Biodiversity Heritage Library (1 publication)
 To Encyclopedia of Life
 To World Register of Marine Species
 Donald K.M., Kennedy M. & Spencer H.G. (2005) The phylogeny and taxonomy of austral monodontine topshells (Mollusca: Gastropoda: Trochidae), inferred from DNA sequences. Molecular Phylogenetics and Evolution 37: 474-483

constellata
Gastropods described in 1863